Agrahara Vaddahalli  is a village in the southern state of Karnataka, India. It is located in the Hosakote taluk of Bangalore Rural district.

See also
 Bangalore Rural
 Districts of Karnataka

References

External links
 https://bangalorerural.nic.in/en/

Villages in Bangalore Rural district